The Catholic Advocate was a newspaper published in Brisbane, Queensland, Australia from 1911 to 1938.

History 
The newspaper was published from 1911 to 1938 by William Luke O'Dwyer.

References 

Newspapers published in Brisbane
1911 establishments in Australia
1938 disestablishments in Australia
Newspapers established in 1911
Publications disestablished in 1938
Defunct newspapers published in Queensland